Marcel Renaud (27 May 1926 – 5 December 2016) was a French sprint and slalom canoeist who competed in the 1940s and the 1950s. Competing in two Summer Olympics, he won a silver medal in the C-2 10000 m event at Melbourne in 1956. Renaud also won a bronze medal in the K-4 1000 m at the 1954 ICF Canoe Sprint World Championships at Mâcon. In canoe slalom, he won a gold medal in the C-1 team event at the 1949 ICF Canoe Slalom World Championships in Geneva.

Renaud's uncle Marcel finished fourth in the 4000 m team pursuit cycling event at Paris in 1924. Both of his sons would win Olympic canoeing medals of their own. His oldest son, Eric, won a bronze in the C-2 1000 m event at the 1984 Summer Olympics in Los Angeles while his youngest son, Philippe, won a bronze in the C-2 500 m at the 1988 Summer Olympics in Seoul.

References

Wallechinsky, David and Jaime Loucky (2008). "Canoeing: Men's Canadian Pairs 1000 Meters". In The Complete Book of the Olympics: 2008 Edition. London: Aurum Press Limited. pp. 481–2.

1926 births
2016 deaths
Canoeists at the 1952 Summer Olympics
Canoeists at the 1956 Summer Olympics
French male canoeists
Olympic canoeists of France
Olympic silver medalists for France
Olympic medalists in canoeing
ICF Canoe Sprint World Championships medalists in kayak
Medalists at the 1956 Summer Olympics
Medalists at the ICF Canoe Slalom World Championships